In linguistic typology, subject–verb–object (SVO) is a sentence structure where the subject comes first, the verb second, and the object third. Languages may be classified according to the dominant sequence of these elements in unmarked sentences (i.e., sentences in which an unusual word order is not used for emphasis). English is included in this group. An example is "Sam ate yogurt." The label often includes ergative languages that do not have subjects, but have an agent–verb–object (AVO) order. 

SVO is the second-most common order by number of known languages, after SOV. Together, SVO and SOV account for more than 87% of the world's languages.

Properties 
Subject–verb–object languages almost always place relative clauses after the nouns which they modify and adverbial subordinators before the clause modified, with varieties of Chinese being notable exceptions.

Although some subject–verb–object languages in West Africa, the best known being Ewe, use postpositions in noun phrases, the vast majority of them, such as English, have prepositions. Most subject–verb–object languages place genitives after the noun, but a significant minority, including the postpositional SVO languages of West Africa, the Hmong–Mien languages, some Sino-Tibetan languages, and European languages like Swedish, Danish, Lithuanian and Latvian have prenominal genitives (as would be expected in an SOV language).

Non-European SVO languages usually have a strong tendency to place adjectives, demonstratives and numerals after the nouns that they modify, but Chinese, Vietnamese, Malaysian and Indonesian place numerals before nouns, as in English. Some linguists have come to view the numeral as the head in the relationship to fit the rigid right-branching of these languages.

There is a strong tendency, as in English, for main verbs to be preceded by auxiliaries: I am thinking. He should reconsider.

Sample sentences 

An example of SVO order in English is:
Andy ate cereal.
In an analytic language such as English, subject–verb–object order is relatively inflexible because it identifies which part of the sentence is the subject and which one is the object. ("The dog bit Andy" and "Andy bit the dog" mean two completely different things, while, in case of "Bit Andy the dog", it may be difficult to determine whether it's a complete sentence or a fragment, with "Andy the dog" the object and an omitted/implied subject.) The situation is more complex in languages that have no word order imposed by their grammar; Russian, Finnish, Ukrainian, and Hungarian have both the VO and OV constructs in their common word order uses.

In some languages, some word orders are considered more "natural" than others. In some, the order is the matter of emphasis. For example, Russian allows the use of subject–verb–object in any order and "shuffles" parts to bring up a slightly different contextual meaning each time. E.g. "любит она его" (loves she him) may be used to point out "she acts this way because she LOVES him", or "его она любит" (him she loves) is used in the context "if you pay attention, you'll see that HE is the one she truly loves", or "его любит она" (him loves she) may appear along the lines "I agree that cat is a disaster, but since my wife adores it and I adore her...". Regardless of order, it is clear that "его" is the object because it is in the accusative case. In Polish, SVO order is basic in an affirmative sentence, and a different order is used to either emphasize some part of it or to adapt it to a broader context logic. For example,  (I won't buy you a bicycle),  (I've been waiting since five).

In Turkish, it is normal to use SOV, but SVO may be used sometimes to emphasize the verb. For example, "John terketti Mary'yi" (Lit. John/left/Mary: John left Mary) is the answer to the question "What did John do with Mary?" instead of the regular [SOV] sentence "John Mary'yi terketti" (Lit. John/Mary/left).

In German, Dutch, and Kashmiri, SVO with V2 word order in main clauses coexists with SOV in subordinate clauses, as given in Example 1 below; and a change in syntax, such as by bringing an adpositional phrase to the front of the sentence for emphasis, may also dictate the use of VSO, as in Example 2. In Kashmiri, the word order in embedded clauses is conditioned by the category of the subordinating conjunction, as in Example 3. 
 (German & Dutch respectively: "He knows that I wash the car each Sunday", lit. "He knows that I each Sunday the car wash".) Cf. the simple sentence , "I wash the car each Sunday."
"Jeden Sonntag wasche ich das Auto."/"Elke zondag was ik de auto." (German & Dutch respectively: "Each Sunday I wash the car.", lit. "Each Sunday wash I the car."). "Ich wasche das Auto jeden Sonntag"/"Ik was de auto elke zondag" translates perfectly into English "I wash the car each Sunday", but as a result of changing the syntax, inversion SV->VS takes place.
Kashmiri:

If the embedded clause is introduced by the transparent conjunction zyi the SOV order changes to SVO. "mye ees phyikyir (zyi) tsi maa dyikh temyis ciThy".

English developed from such a reordering language and still bears traces of this word order, for example in locative inversion ("In the garden sat a cat.") and some clauses beginning with negative expressions: "only" ("Only then do we find X."), "not only" ("Not only did he storm away but also slammed the door."), "under no circumstances" ("under no circumstances are the students allowed to use a mobile phone"), "never" ("Never have I done that."), "on no account" and the like. In such cases, do-support is sometimes required, depending on the construction.

Spanish, in certain cases, when using object pronouns, the word order switches:

See also 
 Subject–object–verb
 Object–subject–verb
 Object–verb–subject
 Verb–object–subject
 Verb–subject–object
 V2 word order
 :Category:Subject–verb–object languages

References 

 
Word order